Superior Council of the French Language or Conseil supérieur de la langue française may refer to:

 Conseil supérieur de la langue française (Belgium), Belgium's French language council; see Centime
 Conseil supérieur de la langue française (France), France's language council; see Reforms of French orthography
 Conseil supérieur de la langue française (Quebec),  an advisory council in Quebec, Canada

See also
 Académie française, French learned body on matters pertaining to the French language
 Conseil (disambiguation)

Francophonie